Gerard "Buzz" Hallock III (June 14, 1905 – May 26, 1996) was an American ice hockey player who competed in the 1932 Winter Olympics.

Born in Pottstown, Pennsylvania, in 1932 he was a member of the American ice hockey team, which won the silver medal. He played one match.

He died in Essex, Connecticut.

External links
profile

1905 births
1996 deaths
People from Pottstown, Pennsylvania
Ice hockey players from Pennsylvania
American men's ice hockey defensemen
Ice hockey players at the 1932 Winter Olympics
Medalists at the 1932 Winter Olympics
Olympic silver medalists for the United States in ice hockey
Sportspeople from Montgomery County, Pennsylvania
Princeton Tigers men's ice hockey players